Raskovka is a rural locality (a selo) in Lugovskoye Rural Settlement, Bogucharsky District, Voronezh Oblast, Russia. The population was 38 as of 2010. There are 7 streets.

Geography 
Raskovka is located 16 km west of Boguchar (the district's administrative centre) by road. Lugovoye is the nearest rural locality.

References 

Rural localities in Bogucharsky District